Superstar Duets is a 2016 Philippine television reality show broadcast by GMA Network. Hosted by Jennylyn Mercado, it premiered on September 3, 2016 on the network's Sabado Star Power sa Gabi line up replacing Lip Sync Battle Philippines. The show concluded on December 17, 2016 with a total of 16 episodes.

Overview 
Superstar Duets debuted on GMA Network, last September 3, 2016.

The game pits one Kapuso celebrity with International star impersonators. The one who will get a lowest score from the judges will be eliminated. Mike "Pekto" Nacua and Seeyah Later was the first who has been eliminated receiving 14 stars. After the first elimination the Kapuso celebrities will meet the second batch of International Stars.

Cast 

Host
 Jennylyn Mercado
 Regine Velasquez 

Judges
 Allan K.
 Aicelle Santos
 Christian Bautista

Contestants
 Michael "Pekto" Nacua
 Joross Gamboa
 Jerald Napoles
 Rita Daniela
 Denise Barbacena
 Divine Aucina
 Nar Cabico
 Jeffrey "Osang" Soliven

International star impersonators

 International star impersonator performed in the wildcard round.
 The Top 5 celebrity contestants were also the international star impersonators on this episode.
 International star impersonator performed in the grand finals.

Preliminary rounds
Color key

Round 1
The contestants will be divided into two batch. Each batch will have two contestants who got the lowest score placed in the bottom group . Bottom group contestants will face the elimination round while the safe contestants will fight for immunity.

Round 2
The same rule applies for this round except for the immunity round.

Round 3
The same rule applies for this round except for the third elimination wherein each of the bottom group contestants will have their Celebrity resbaker.

Round 4
The five remaining contestants will perform. The contestant with lowest star rating from the judges will be eliminated from the competition.

Wildcard round
The 4 eliminated contestants perform again for a second chance to be back at the competition. The contestant with highest star rating will re-enter the competition. All songs performed on this episode are songs of Aegis.

Finals
 Color key

Round 5
The Final 5 contestants will impersonate an international star of their choice instead of having an impersonator partner as duet. Each celebrity contestant will be paired to OPM icons. The contestant with lowest score will be eliminated from the competition.

Quarter finals
The Final 4 contestants perform. The celebrity contestant with lowest star rating will be eliminated from the competition. All songs performed are songs of Regine Velasquez.

Semi finals
The final 3 contestants perform. The celebrity contestant with lowest star rating will be eliminated from the competition. Ai-Ai delas Alas served as a judge.

Grand finals
The grand finals consists of 3 rounds wherein the final 2 contestants will perform. On the first round, they will have a concert style duet with Lani Misalucha. The second round will be video mirroring challenge wherein they will copy a music video content. And for the third round, the final 2 will have a duet with international superstar of their choice. Ai-Ai delas Alas served as the 4th judge.

Elimination chart

Ratings
Urban Luzon and NUTAM (Nationwide Urban Television Audience Measurement) ratings are provided by AGB Nielsen Philippines while Kantar Media Philippines provide Nationwide ratings (Urban + Rural).

Accolades

References

External links
 

2016 Philippine television series debuts
2016 Philippine television series endings
Filipino-language television shows
GMA Network original programming
Philippine reality television series